The 2019–20 season was the 94th season in the existence of FC Lorient and the club's third consecutive season in the second division of French football. In addition to the domestic league, Lorient participated in this season's editions of the Coupe de France and the Coupe de la Ligue. The season was scheduled to cover the period from 1 July 2019 to 30 June 2020.

Players

First-team squad

Transfers

In

Out

Pre-season and friendlies

Competitions

Overview

Ligue 2

League table

Results summary

Results by round

Matches
The league fixtures were announced on 14 June 2019. The Ligue 2 matches were suspended by the LFP on 13 March 2020 due to COVID-19 until further notices. On 28 April 2020, it was announced that Ligue 1 and Ligue 2 campaigns would not resume, after the country banned all sporting events until September. On 30 April, The LFP ended officially the 2019–20 season.

Coupe de France

Coupe de la Ligue

References

External links

FC Lorient seasons
Lorient